The Central African Republic national basketball team is administered by the Fédération Centrafricaine de Basketball.

The team won the African Basketball Championship twice. It became the first Sub-Saharan African team to qualify for the Basketball World Cup.

Achievements

The Central African Republic has won the African Championship twice. Their first title came in 1974 when they hosted the tournament and beat Senegal 72–67 in the final. They hoisted the trophy again in 1987 by defeating Egypt 94–87 for the championship. The team also took third place in the 1968 tournament.

Performances

Olympic Games

FIBA World Championship

FIBA Africa Championship

African Games

1991 : 
Beginning with the 2019 event, regular basketball was replaced by 3x3 basketball.

Team

Current roster
Roster for the AfroBasket 2021.

Head coach position
  Jean-Paul Rabatet
  Johny Robert Madozein – 2001–2003
  Michel Perrim – 2007
  Eugene Pehoua-Pelema – 2009
  Johny Robert Madozein – 2010
  Paco Garcia – 2011
  Johny Robert Madozein – 2013
  Michel Perrim – 2015
  Aubin-Thierry Goporo – 2015
  Ulrich Marida – 2017–present

Past rosters
2013 AfroBasket: finished 13th among 16 teams

At the AfroBasket 2015.

This was the Central African Republic team for the AfroBasket 2017.

Kit

Manufacturer
2015–2020: – Peak

Sponsor
2015 – Orange

See also
Central African Republic women's national basketball team
Central African Republic national under-19 basketball team
Central African Republic national under-17 basketball team
Central African Republic national 3x3 team

References

External links
FIBA Profile
Africabasket – Central African Republic Men National Team

Videos
#AfroBasket – Day 1: Central African Republic v Mozambique (highlights)

 
Men's national basketball teams
Basketball in the Central African Republic
1963 establishments in the Central African Republic